The 1969–70 Hong Kong First Division League season was the 59th since its establishment.

League table

References
1969–70 Hong Kong First Division table (RSSSF)

Hong Kong First Division League seasons
Hong
football